The 2023 Copa Argentina (officially the Copa Argentina AXION energy 2023 for sponsorship reasons) is the thirteenth edition of the Copa Argentina, and the eleventh since the relaunch of the tournament in 2011. The competition began on 24 January and will end in TBD 2023. Patronato are the defending champions.

The champions will qualify for the 2024 Copa Libertadores.

Teams
Sixty-four teams will take part in this competition: All twenty-eight teams from the Primera División; fifteen teams of the Primera Nacional; five from the Primera B, four from the Primera C; two from the Primera D and ten teams from Federal A.

First Level

Primera División
All twenty-eight teams of the 2022 tournament qualified.

 Aldosivi
 Argentinos Juniors
 Arsenal
 Atlético Tucumán
 Banfield
 Barracas Central
 Boca Juniors
 Central Córdoba (SdE)
 Colón
 Defensa y Justicia
 Estudiantes (LP)

 Godoy Cruz
 Huracán
 Independiente
 Lanús
 Newell's Old Boys
 Patronato
 Platense
 Racing
 River Plate
 Rosario Central
 San Lorenzo
 Sarmiento (J)
 Talleres (C)
 Tigre
 Unión
 Vélez Sarsfield

Second Level

Primera Nacional
The top fifteen teams of the 2022 tournament qualified.

 All Boys
 Almagro
 Belgrano
 Chacarita Juniors
 Chaco For Ever
  Defensores de Belgrano
 Deportivo Morón
 Deportivo Riestra
 Estudiantes (BA)
 Estudiantes (RC)
 Gimnasia y Esgrima (M)
 Independiente Rivadavia
  Instituto
 San Martín (SJ)
 San Martín (T)

Third Level

Primera B Metropolitana
The champion and the top three teams of the 2022 Primera B tournament and the winner of "2021 Torneo Complemento" qualified.

  Colegiales
 Comunicaciones
 Defensores Unidos
  Deportivo Armenio
  Ituzaingó

Torneo Federal A
The top five teams of each zone of the 2022 tournament qualified.

 Central Norte
 Ciudad de Bolívar
 Gimnasia y Tiro
  Independiente (Ch)
 Olimpo
 Racing (C)
 San Martín (F)
 Sarmiento (R)
 Sol de Mayo
 Villa Mitre

Fourth Level

Primera C Metropolitana
The champion and the top three teams of the 2022 Primera C tournament qualified.

  Argentino (M)
 Claypole
  Deportivo Español
  Excursionistas

Fifth Level

Primera D Metropolitana
The top team of 2022 Primera D tournament and the winner of "Torneo Complemento" qualified.

  Centro Español
  Yupanqui

Round and draw dates

Final Rounds

Draw
The draw for the Final Rounds was held on 3 November 2022, 17:00 at AFA Futsal Stadium in Ezeiza. The 64 qualified teams were divided in four groups. Teams were seeded by their historical performance and Division. Champions of AFA tournaments playing in Argentine Primera División were allocated to Group A. The matches were drawn from the respective confronts: A vs. C; B vs. D. Some combinations were avoided for security reasons.

Bracket

Upper bracket

Lower bracket

Round of 64
The Round of 64 will have 10 qualified teams from the Torneo Federal A, 11 qualified teams from the Metropolitan Zone (5 teams from Primera B Metropolitana; 4 teams from Primera C Metropolitana and 2 teams from Primera D Metropolitana), 15 teams from Primera Nacional and 28 teams from Primera División. The round will be played between 24 January and TBD 2023, in a single knock-out match format. The 32 winning teams will advance to the Round of 32.

Round of 32
This round will have 32 qualified teams from the Round of 64. The round will be played between TBD and TBD 2023, in a single knock-out match format. The 16 winning teams will advance to the Round of 16.

Round of 16
This round will have the 16 qualified teams from the Round of 32. The round will be played between TBD and TBD 2023, in a single knock-out match format. The 8 winning teams will advance to the Quarterfinals.

Quarterfinals
This round will have the 8 qualified teams from the Round of 16. The round will be played between TBD and TBD 2023, in a single knock-out match format. The 4 winning teams will advance to the Semifinals.

Semifinals
This round will have the 4 qualified teams from the Quarterfinals. The round will be played between TBD and TBD 2023, in a single knock-out match format. The 2 winning teams will advance to the Final.

Final

Top goalscorers

References

External links
 Official site 
 Copa Argentina on the Argentine Football Association's website 

2023
Argentina
2023 in Argentine football